Kenneth Wolski (born September 16, 1948) is an American activist from New Jersey. Wolski resides in Trenton, New Jersey and is the executive director of the Coalition for Medical Marijuana - New Jersey and a registered nurse. In 2012, Wolski ran for U.S. Senator from New Jersey as the nominee of the Green Party of New Jersey. Kicking off his campaign at the March 2012 convention, Wolski said, "I will campaign to end the influence of corporate money on elected officials, to end the destructive and ineffective War on Drugs, and to ensure free and universal health care for all Americans".  He finished 4th of 11 candidates, receiving 15,801 votes (0.47%).

Wolski is an advocate of marijuana legalization. In November 2015, Wolski testified before a New Jersey Senate Judiciary Committee hearing in favor of legalization.

During the 1960s and early 1970s, Wolski was an outspoken opponent of the Vietnam War. He took part in numerous anti-war actions, and demonstrations including the  
Spring Mobilization's march against the Vietnam War in San Francisco on April 15, 1967,
and the 1971 May Day protests, a series of large-scale civil disobedience actions in Washington, D.C.
He was a proponent of free speech, academic freedom, women's rights, civil rights, sexual freedom, and drug policy reform.

Wolski earned a B.A. in philosophy at Rutgers University–New Brunswick in 1971. He also earned an AAS in nursing from Mercer County Community College in 1976 and MPA from Rutgers University–Newark in 1992.

References

1948 births
Living people
American cannabis activists
New Jersey Greens
People from Trenton, New Jersey
Rutgers University alumni
Mercer County Community College alumni